Solex is a brand name owned by a subsidiary of Italian auto parts manufacturer Magneti Marelli.  The original Solex company was French-owned and produced carburetors and gasoline powered bicycles. It went through several name and ownership changes starting in 1992.

Solex carburetors were used by many European automobile companies, including Rolls-Royce Motors, Land Rover, Mercedes Benz, Volkswagen, and Porsche, and were licensed to Japanese maker Mikuni. They are no longer made by any derivation of the original French firm.  

Similarly, motorized bicycle manufacture was discontinued in France in 1988. Since ownership has fallen under the Magneti Marelli umbrella, production shifted to China, and Hungary, was discontinued in Hungary in 2002, and resumed in France as of 2005 with a line of gasoline and electric-powered bikes and mopeds being sold as of 2021 under the VéloSoleX banner, part of the EasyBike Group. It still uses the brand name Solex to associate its products with the heritage of the original French manufacturer.

History
The Solex company was founded by Marcel Mennesson and Maurice Goudard to manufacture vehicle radiators. These were fitted to several makes of early cars including Delaunay-Belleville and buses of the Paris General Omnibus company.

After World War I, the radiator business went into decline and the company bought the rights to the carburetor patents of Jouffret and Renée and named them Solex after their business.

The Solex brand is now owned by Magneti Marelli.  The original Solex company changed its name in 1994 to Magneti Marelli France and on May 31, 2001, Magneti Marelli France partially bought its assets (including the trademark SOLEX) from Magneti Marelli Motopropulsion France S.A.S.

Carburetors
Solex carburetors were widely used by many European makers and under license to Mikuni in Asia until the mid-1980s when fuel injection was widely adopted. Among the European companies which used Solex carburetors were: Rolls-Royce Motors, Alfa Romeo, Bristol, Fiat, Audi, Ford, BMW, Citroën, Opel, Simca, Saab, Renault, Peugeot, Lancia, Land Rover Series, Lada, Mercedes Benz, Volvo, Volkswagen, Zündapp and Porsche.

Solex carburetors have been made under licence by a number of companies including Mikuni of Japan, which entered into a licensed manufacturing agreement with Solex in 1960 and further developed many of Solex's original designs. Japanese automakers and motorcycle manufacturers using Mikuni carburetors included: Toyota, Mitsubishi, Suzuki, Nissan, and Yamaha.

Powered bicycles

The VéloSoleX has a  motor mounted above the front wheel. Power is delivered via a small ceramic roller that rotates directly on the front wheel by friction to the tire.

The first prototype of a VéloSoleX was created in 1941 and used regular bicycle frames such as those under the Alcyon brand and were powered by a  engine developed by Solex. VéloSoleX were produced commercially and sold starting in 1946 with a 45 cc engine without clutch, then later with a 49 cc engine. The solex, although not varying much from one version to the next, was sold in these models:
 1946–53: 45 cc
 1953–55: 330 (first 49 cc engine; no clutch)
 1955–57: 660
 1957–58: 1010
 1958–59: 1400
 1959–61: 1700 (first version equipped with a clutch)
 1961–64: 2200
 1964–66: 3300 (first frame with a square section)
 1966–88: 3800
 1971–88: 5000

Export versions were also created (sold outside France)
 3800 Export
 4600 (V3 Sold only in the US)
 5000

Current version (made in France)
 2007–2011:  VéloSoleX 4800

More than eight million were eventually sold, mostly in Europe. It was also constructed under licence in many countries. Today, the VéloSoleX is again manufactured in France. The trademark "VELOSOLEX" is the property of Velosolex America, LLC which markets the VéloSoleX motorized bicycle worldwide.

Company timeline
 1905: The company was created by Maurice Goudard and Marcel Mennesson, both graduates of the École Centrale Paris.
 1973: the carburetor division is taken over by Matra, and later by Magneti Marelli, then by Renault and Motobécane in 1974.
 1983: Motobécane is bought by Yamaha and becomes MBK.
 1988: production in France, at Saint-Quentin, ends.
 Circa 2001 production ceased in China and restarted in France.
 In June 2004, the mark "Solex" was bought by the French group CIBIÉ
 In October 2005 CIBIÉ launched the e-Solex, designed by Pininfarina and produced in China (400 W brushless electric motor, 35 km/h, autonomy of 30 km)
 In 2009, CIBIÉ launches the e-Solex 2.0, a new version with a lithium polymer battery

References

External links
Mikuni
Magneti Marelli
SoleXin - a list of SoleX resources

Carburetor manufacturers
Motorcycle manufacturers of France
Manufacturing companies established in 1905
Moped manufacturers
French brands
Engine fuel system technology
Fiat
Cycle manufacturers of France
French companies established in 1905